Reading for special needs has become an area of interest as the understanding of reading has improved. Teaching children with special needs how to read was not historically pursued due to perspectives of a Reading Readiness model. This model assumes that a reader must learn to read in a hierarchical manner such that one skill must be mastered before learning the next skill (e.g., a child might be expected to learn the names of the letters in the alphabet in the correct order before being taught how to read his or her name). This approach often led to teaching sub-skills of reading in a decontextualized manner. This style of teaching made it difficult for children to master these early skills, and as a result, did not advance to more advanced literacy instruction and often continued to receive age-inappropriate instruction (e.g., singing the alphabet song).

During the mid-to-late 1970s, the education system shifted to targeting functional skills that were age appropriate for people with special needs. This led to teaching sight words that were viewed as necessary for participation in the school and community (e.g., "exit", "danger", "poison", "go"). This approach was an improvement to previous practices, but it limited the range of literacy skills that people with special needs developed.

A newer model for reading development, specifically with regard to early reading development, is emergent literacy, sometimes referred to as early literacy, model. This model purports that children begin reading from birth, and that learning to read is an interactive process based on children's exposure to literate activities. It is under this new model that children with developmental disabilities and special needs have been considered to be able to learn to read. Note that there is limited research regarding reading in special needs, but this article attempts to represent the most current evidence on this topic.

Literacy
Literacy refers to both reading and writing skills, writing being the symbolic representation of language, and reading the cognitive process of decoding and understanding the written symbol system. These are very broad and basic definitions as the definitions of these terms often vary based on the model or approach.

Approaches and models of reading
There are multiple models and approaches of reading. A few are discussed below.

The Simple View of Reading
The Simple View of Reading was originally described by Gough and Tunmer in 1986 and modified by Hoover and Gough in 1990. The Simple View suggests that the ultimate goal of reading comprehension, and in order to have good reading comprehension, one needs to have good decoding ability (e.g., ability to interpret the symbols) and good listening comprehension (e.g., one's ability to understand oral language). This model predicts four categories of readers. Readers with poor decoding skills but relatively preserved listening comprehension skills would be considered readers who are poor decoders, or dyslexic. Readers with poor listening comprehension skills are referred to as readers who are poor comprehenders. Readers with poor decoding skills and poor listening comprehension skills are considered poor readers, or sometimes referred to as garden-variety poor readers. Readers who have good decoding and listening comprehension skills are considered typical readers.

The connectionist model of reading development
Connectionist models have emphasized an interconnected and interactive system of mappings between printed words (orthography), spoken sounds/words (phonology), and word meanings (semantics). The computation of these three codes (orthographic, phonologic, and semantic) is required for reading. According to Seidenberg and McClelland, one mechanism is involved in reading (including reading regular words, exception words, and nonwords). Through development, experience with meaningful words and spelling-sound correspondences allow one's representation of semantics, orthography, and phonology to be modified. Developing representations of orthography, phonology, and semantics is an interactive process where development of one component influences and is influenced by the other components.

Dual-route approach
The dual-route approach suggests that two separate mechanisms, or routes, can be used in word reading. Words that follow spelling-sound rules (including regular words and nonwords that follow letter-to-sound rules) are processed through the nonlexical route. The nonlexical route follows a system of rules specifying the relationship between letters and sounds to process words. Conversely, exception words, or irregular words, that do not follow the spelling-sound rules are processed through the lexical route. The lexical route can be thought of as a dictionary lookup procedure.

Whole language
Reading is a linguistic act. With this, some have applied the whole language philosophy to reading instruction. In the early 1990s, a movement for whole language encouraged educators to view learning to read as being similar to learning to talk. This philosophy emphasizes learning language and reading skills through meaningful experiences instead of through decontextualized rule teaching. Some other terms for this approach of reading instruction include literature-based instruction and guided reading.

Balanced Literacy Instruction
To meet the recommendations of breadth and depth of literacy instruction set by the National Reading Panel (2000), many literacy programs incorporate four main components: guided reading, which focuses on comprehension skills though exposure to a wide range of literature experiences; word study, which incorporates phonics, phonemic awareness, and vocabulary instruction; self-selected reading, which provides children daily experiences in independent reading time; and writing, which focuses on both the mechanics of composition and on communicating effectively for multiple purposes (Foley & Stables, 2007).

Populations at increased risk
Children with language difficulties are at increased risk for reading disorders or difficulties that can occur early on in preschool and continue on throughout development. This population includes children with language abilities that fall below expectations for their chronological age, at a clinical level or with weaknesses in language that are not severe enough to meet criteria for a clinical diagnosis of a language disorder.
Children with other disabilities can also have language impairments that can cause an increase risk of developing reading problems. Such disabilities include (but are not restricted to): Specific language impairment, phonological disorder, Language disorder, Developmental disability, autism spectrum disorder, Down syndrome, Fragile X syndrome, and Cerebral palsy.

People with severe speech difficulties can use augmentative and alternative communication (AAC) devices. The importance and positive outcomes of literacy for people with language difficulties and AAC users are endless. As with everyone literacy opens doors to education, employment, and allows "individuals to exchange information, maintain interpersonal communication, to convey needs and wants and to develop channels of personal expression". However, for the AAC user literacy skills may be of even greater importance as reading and writing "allows individuals with severe speech impairments the opportunity to initiate topics, to develop ideas, to provide clarification, to communicate independently, to interact with a diverse audience, and to express ideas, thoughts, and feelings." Unfortunately, even given the importance of literacy skills people who use AAC are often not given "authentic learning opportunities" to learn literacy skills. More research is needed on how to increase literacy instruction to people with severe speech difficulties and users of AAC.

Intervention team
Classroom teachers are expected to provide the primary source of reading instruction for most students. Special education teachers may supplement the classroom instruction in reading and writing skills based on the independent performance of their students. Other professionals including a reading specialist, a speech-language pathologist, an educational or school psychologist, and an occupational therapist may also provide reading and writing support to individuals with reading and writing difficulties.

Subgroups of reading problems

Difficulties with decoding
In general terms, individuals who have challenges in decoding are referred to as poor decoders. Dyslexia is a more specific disability where individuals demonstrate difficulty with decoding. Poor decoders have not acquired the basic knowledge of sound-letter correspondence rules, specifically phonological skills (skills that include identifying and manipulation of words, syllables, onsets, rimes, and phonemes -individual sounds). In addition, language abilities often evidence poor morphological and syntactic knowledge. Interventions that target decoding abilities may include instruction in phonics, phonological awareness, and phonemic awareness (also see Dyslexia intervention).

Difficulties with reading rate
Some individuals may have difficulty with reading rate, where they have accurate word recognition and often normal comprehension abilities, but reading speed that is typically one and a half years below grade level.
Strategies that may improve reading rate include: shared/partner reading, guided reading, repeated reading, and silent reading, listening to another person fluently read (National Reading Panel, 2000;).

Difficulties with reading fluency
Individuals may also have trouble with reading fluency, or accurate, smooth, and appropriately paced reading with accurate expression.
Strategies: shared/partner reading, guided reading, repeated reading, and silent reading, listening to another person fluently read (National Reading Panel, 2000).

Difficulties with reading comprehension
Some individuals may have skills within the normal range on the above factors but may still have trouble with reading comprehension. These individuals are often referred to as poor comprehenders, or individuals with a specific comprehension deficit. 
Strategies that can be used to improve reading comprehension include: building oral and auditory language skills, including skills in: vocabulary knowledge, narratives, listening comprehension, and figurative language. Additionally, when working toward increasing reading comprehension for specific texts, one can preteach vocabulary words and discuss prior knowledge on a topic related to the text before reading. (Also see reading comprehension for more strategies and information.)

Mixed reading difficulties
Children can have difficulties in more than one of the areas previously listed.

Reading in special populations
Reading difficulties in special populations such as Downs syndrome, autism, and cerebral palsy follow similar patterns of reading development and reading difficulty as described in the subgroups of reading problems section.

Down syndrome
It has been found true for children with intellectual disabilities, such as children with Down syndrome, that phonological awareness skills are often deficient and require targeted teaching. For example, studies have found that children with Down syndrome show deficits in phonological awareness, and though they can develop such skills, often rely on sight word vocabulary knowledge rather than phonological awareness skills to decode words. Given this, it is recommended that phonological awareness skills be taught in a systematic manner with explicit instruction of how to use these skills when reading.

Autism
Children with autism spectrum disorder (ASD) have been identified as having particular difficulties with reading comprehension despite normal decoding abilities,. Historically, those individuals who are especially good at decoding but have poor comprehension are considered to have hyperlexia. Not all individuals with autism, however, are poor comprehenders as there is a wide range of abilities in children on the spectrum. Despite the type of reader an individual with autism might be, individuals should be given the opportunity to learn to read.
Very few studies have examined the effectiveness of interventions for reading for individuals with ASD.
Using computer-assisted instruction to implement programs for individuals with ASD that target skills in decoding could be an effective way to help improve these skills in these individuals. Procedural facilitation tasks such as prereading questions, anaphoric cuing, or a cloze task helped to improve reading comprehension with the anaphoric cuing task being the most effective task.

Cerebral palsy
Children with cerebral palsy (CP) may or may not have motor speech impairments and/or language impairments, which can lead to reading difficulties. Often children with CP can be classified as having severe speech and physical impairments (SSPI), but children with other disorders can fall into this category as well. Children with SSPI can be at increased risk for reading difficulties not only because they may have language impairments, but also because they can have limited literary experiences and limited reading instruction. Additionally, parents and teachers may have low expectations of the child's ability to become a reader, which may influence experiences with text and impact literacy instruction. Assistive technology (also Alternative and Augmentative Communication devices; AAC) can be used to overcome physical barriers to manipulating books, and to augment speech motor and language difficulties (e.g., type, or select symbols to identify rhyming words), and cognitive impairments (to provide needed support required for target skill acquisition) (Copeland & Keef, 2007, see chapter 9). Of course, access to assistive devices is not sufficient for reading development. Appropriate reading instruction is required (e.g., instruction in phonological awareness skills, phonemic awareness skills, phonics, fluency, vocabulary, text comprehension, and book conventions), regularly conducted story reading sessions, constructive AT/AAC use to target literacy skills, high expectations of student literacy achievement, and text-rich environments have been found to be important for developing literacy skills in children with CP.

References

External links 
Special Reads for Special Needs, reading materials designed for children and young adults with Down's Syndrome, ADD, ADHD, FAS and other disabilities.
Special Education Resources on the Internet SERI a collection of Internet accessible information resources of interest to those involved in the fields related to Special Education.
SNOW designed to serve as a resource centre for teachers dealing with special needs students.
 Teaching children with special needs how to read
 Symbol World - On-line magazine using symbols for the reading impaired
 Various software for special needs—to increase reading comprehension
Ontario Ministry of Education – Province-wide standards for special education - Ontario, Canada
^ Anderson, Mark, The WordPen Learning System, Spring 2004

Reading (process)
Dyslexia
Learning disabilities
Learning to read
Special education
Literacy